Lahaska is a defunct station on the Reading Company's New Hope Branch. The station is currently on the line used by the New Hope Railroad.  The station is located in the 18938 zip code on Street Road at milepost 33. Passenger services ended in 1952 when the line after Hatboro (and later Warminster) was shut down. After passenger service was discontinued, the station building was purchased by a local land owner who moved it to his property about a quarter mile away from its original location and converted it into a private residence.
In 1966, it became a part of the New Hope Railroad. In the late 1980s, the New Hope Railroad constructed a passing siding, built at Lahaska,  for locomotives to run around their train. Lahaska became the terminus for the new regular train (45-minutes long), which replaced the destination of Buckingham Valley station, of which trips took 75-minutes to complete.

References

Former Reading Company stations
Railway stations in the United States opened in 1891
Railway stations closed in 1952
Former railway stations in Bucks County, Pennsylvania
Frank Furness buildings
Relocated buildings and structures in Pennsylvania